The Nona Balakian Citation for Excellence in Reviewing, established in 1991, is an annual literary award presented by the National Book Critics Circle (NBCC) to honor Nona Balakian, one of three NBCC founders. The award recognizes an NBCC's members "outstanding work" and has been called "the most prestigious award for book criticism in the country."

Recipients

References

External links 

 Official website

Awards established in 2013
American literary awards
21st-century literary awards